Hakea megadenia is a shrub or tree of the family Proteacea  endemic to an area along the east coast of Tasmania and the Furneaux Island group off the coast of Tasmania.

Description
The branchlets are covered densely in flattened hairs. The inflorescence  on female plants has 1-8 flowers and the male 3-14 flowers. The white to cream flowers appear in leaf axils from February to July.

Taxonomy and naming
Hakea megadenia was first formally described in 1991 by R.M.Barker and published in Aspects of Tasmanian Botany - a tribute to Winifred Curtis. The specific epithet (megadenia) is derived from the ancient Greek mega meaning "large" and aden, adenos meaning "gland", referring to the long gland in this species.

Distribution and habitat
This species is found on the east coast of Tasmania  and the Furneaux group of islands.  Growing at lower altitudes in coastal areas, river bushland or drier forest.  On the islands it grows at higher altitudes with longer leaves and perianth and larger fruit.

References

megadenia
Flora of Tasmania
Plants described in 1991
Taxa named by Robyn Mary Barker